Punicacortein C is an ellagitannin, a phenolic compound. It is found in the bark of Punica granatum (pomegranate). The molecule contains a gallagic acid component.

References 

Pomegranate ellagitannins